Ailing, Ai-ling, or, similar; is a female Chinese given name. It may be Anglicized as Irene, Eileen, or similar. 



People with Chinese names variously romanized as "Ailing" or similar include:

愛玲 / 爱玲

:

People
 Irene Ang (♀; 洪愛玲) beauty pageant contestant from Singapore at the Miss Chinese International Pageant 1993
 Eileen Chang (♀; 張愛玲; 1920–1995; as Zhang Ailing and Chang Ai-ling) Chinese-American author
 Eleanor Goodman (♀; 顾爱玲; as Gu Ailing; born 1975) U.S. translator of Chinese works

 Liu Ailing (♀; 刘爱玲; born 1967) Chinese soccer player
 Ong Ai Leng (♀; 王爱玲; born 1978; Wang Ailing) Malaysian-Chinese actress
  (♀; 童愛玲; born 1972), a Taiwanese actress and contestant on Hong Kong TV show Beautiful Cooking
 Zhang Ailing (badminton) (♀; 张爱玲; born 1957) Chinese badminton player

Characters
 Mak Oi Ling (♀; 麥愛玲), a fictional character from Hongkong/Shanghai Cantonese/Mandarin TV show Growing Through Life

愛凌 / 爱凌
:

 Gu Ailing (♀; 谷爱凌; born 2003 as Eileen Gu) American-Chinese freestyle skier

藹齡 / 蔼龄
:

 Nancy Soong Ai-ling (♀; 宋藹齡; 1888–1973; also Ellen Soong) Taiwanese-Chinese businesswoman

See also

 
 Gladys Li Ling-Ai (1908–2003) Chinese-American filmmaker
 Ai (disambiguation)
 Ail (disambiguation)
 Ing (disambiguation)
 Ling (disambiguation)
 
 
 
 Eileen (disambiguation), sometimes used as an anglicization of the Chinese Ailing
 Irene (disambiguation), sometimes used as an anglicisation of the Chinese Ailing